Psalidothrips is a genus of thrips in the family Phlaeothripidae, first described by Hermann Priesner in 1932.

Species
Species listed in ITIS: 
 Psalidothrips amens
 Psalidothrips ananthakrishnani
 Psalidothrips angustus
 Psalidothrips armatus
 Psalidothrips ascitus
 Psalidothrips bicoloratus
 Psalidothrips chebalingicus
 Psalidothrips comosus
 Psalidothrips conciliatus
 Psalidothrips consimilis
 Psalidothrips dissidens
 Psalidothrips elegatus
 Psalidothrips fabarius
 Psalidothrips grandis
 Psalidothrips latizonus
 Psalidothrips lewisi
 Psalidothrips longiceps
 Psalidothrips longidens
 Psalidothrips longistylus
 Psalidothrips minor
 Psalidothrips moeone
 Psalidothrips nigroterminatus
 Psalidothrips oblongulus
 Psalidothrips ochraceus
 Psalidothrips pitkini
 Psalidothrips retifer
 Psalidothrips seticornis
 Psalidothrips simplus
 Psalidothrips spinosus
 Psalidothrips sturmi
 Psalidothrips tane
 Psalidothrips taylori
 Psalidothrips umbraticus
Sixteen species are native to Australia.
Psalidothrips bipictus 
Psalidothrips brittoni 
Psalidothrips cecryphalus 
Psalidothrips daguilari 
Psalidothrips driesseni 
Psalidothrips gloriousi 
Psalidothrips greensladeae 
Psalidothrips howei 
Psalidothrips minantennus 
Psalidothrips platetus 
Psalidothrips postlei 
Psalidothrips taylori 
Psalidothrips tritus 
Psalidothrips trivius 
Psalidothrips verus 
Psalidothrips wellsae

References

External links
Lucid multi-access key: Factsheet for Psalidothrips

Phlaeothripidae
Thrips
Thrips genera
Taxa named by Hermann Priesner